The 2007 European Track Championships were the European Championships for track cycling, for junior and under 23 riders. They took place in Cottbus, Germany from 11 – 15 July 2007.

Medal summary

Open

Omnium

Omnium sprint

Under 23

Juniors

Medal table

References

See also
2007 in track cycling

European Track Championships, 2007
European Track Championships